Marta Capurso (born August 18, 1980 in Turin) is an Italian short track speed skater who won bronze in the 3000m relay at the 2006 Winter Olympics.

References

1980 births
Living people
Italian female speed skaters
Italian female short track speed skaters
Olympic short track speed skaters of Italy
Olympic bronze medalists for Italy
Olympic medalists in short track speed skating
Short track speed skaters at the 2002 Winter Olympics
Short track speed skaters at the 2006 Winter Olympics
Medalists at the 2006 Winter Olympics
Universiade medalists in short track speed skating
Universiade silver medalists for Italy
Universiade bronze medalists for Italy
Competitors at the 2003 Winter Universiade
Competitors at the 2007 Winter Universiade
Sportspeople from Turin